Peter Čvirik  (born 13 June 1979) is a Slovak former football defender.

Honours
Košice
Slovak Super Liga: 1996–97
Žilina
Slovak Super Liga: 2001–02
Púchov
Slovak Cup: 2002–03

External links

1979 births
Living people
Slovak footballers
Association football defenders
FK Dukla Banská Bystrica players
MŠK Žilina players
OFK 1948 Veľký Lapáš players
FC Petržalka players
Lechia Gdańsk players
Lechia Gdańsk II players
FC Spartak Trnava players
FC Universitatea Cluj players
People from Levice
Sportspeople from the Nitra Region
Slovak Super Liga players
Liga I players
Czech First League players
FC Vysočina Jihlava players
Expatriate footballers in Romania
Expatriate footballers in Poland
Slovak expatriate sportspeople in Poland
Slovak expatriate sportspeople in Romania
Slovak expatriate sportspeople in the Czech Republic
Slovak expatriate footballers
Expatriate footballers in the Czech Republic